Matthias Trübner is an East German bobsledder who competed in the mid-1980s. He won a gold medal in the four-man event at the 1985 FIBT World Championships in Cervinia.

Trübner became a bobsleigh coach in his home state of Thuringia in East Germany (now Germany) after he retired from the sport. One of his star pupils was André Lange. He has also coached bobsleigh driver Maximilian Arndt.

References
André Lange official website with mention of Trübner 
Bobsleigh four-man world championship medalists since 1930
Lange wins gold in Turin with mention of Trübner 

German male bobsledders
Living people
Year of birth missing (living people)